"Eclipse" is the tenth and final track from British progressive rock band Pink Floyd's 1973 album, The Dark Side of the Moon. It was written and sung by Roger Waters, with harmonies by David Gilmour and Rick Wright. After Waters left the band, Gilmour sang the lead vocal when performing live.

On the album, the song transitions, without noticeable break, from the previous song, "Brain Damage", and the two are often played together as a single track on the radio (some DJs call the combined track "The Dark Side of the Moon"). The end of the track consists of a fading heartbeat, identical to the opening of the first track on the album, "Speak to Me".

Composition 

This song serves as the album's end and features a loud, repetitive melody that builds up, then ends with a very quiet outro. When the main instrumentation ends at 1:30, the sound of a heartbeat from the first track, "Speak to Me", appears, which appears again in 9/8, and gradually fades to silence.

Harmonically, the song consists of a repeating 4-bar chord progression: D, D/C, B♭maj7, and A7sus4 resolving to A7. The bass line is a descending tetrachord.

David Gilmour recorded two tracks of rhythm guitar, playing arpeggios, one in open position, and one much higher, around the tenth fret. The lower-pitched guitar part includes the open G and E strings during the B♭maj7, resulting in an added sixth and a dissonant augmented fourth. The quartet of female backing singers vary their parts, rising in volume, and echoing some of Roger Waters' lyrics, as the piece builds in intensity. On the last repetition of the chord progression, the B♭maj7 leads directly to a climax on D major, resulting in a "brightening" effect (known as the Picardy third), as the aforementioned implication of D minor in the B♭maj7 chord shifts to the major.

Waters wrote the lyrics on the road for the "Brain Damage" / "Eclipse" closing sequence as he felt the whole piece was "unfinished". The final words sung on the song and, indeed the album The Dark Side of the Moon, directs the listener, "and everything under the sun is in tune, but the sun is eclipsed by the moon." Waters explained the meaning of these words as well as the entire song by asserting:

The doorman of Abbey Road Studios, Gerry O'Driscoll, is heard speaking at 1:37, answering the question: "What is 'the dark side of the moon'?" with: "There is no dark side in the moon, really. Matter of fact, it's all dark. The only thing that makes it look light is the sun."

A section of an orchestral version of the Beatles song "Ticket to Ride" which was covered by Hollyridge Strings can be heard faintly at the very end of the recording. That was unintended: the music was playing in the background at Abbey Road when Gerry O'Driscoll was being recorded. This is not included on the 1983 Japanese Black Triangle CD issue of the album; the sound technicians copied one of the heartbeat samples, removed the orchestral "Ticket to Ride", repeatedly pasted the sample in and faded out the new outro.

Usage 

On 10 March 2004, the song was used to wake the Mars probe Opportunity. It was chosen in recognition of the transit of the Martian moon Phobos. This is not the first time Pink Floyd has been played in outer space; Russian cosmonauts took and played an advance copy of Delicate Sound of Thunder aboard Soyuz TM-7, making it the first album played in space.

At the opening ceremonies of the 2012 London Olympics, the song was played following the lighting of the torch and accompanied by a huge fireworks display and a photo montage of (mainly) British Olympians.

A remixed version by film composer Hans Zimmer was featured in the first trailer for Dune, released on September 9, 2020.

This song was considered, but ultimately rejected, for inclusion on Echoes: The Best of Pink Floyd.

Personnel 

 Roger Waters – bass guitar, lead vocals
 David Gilmour – electric guitars, backing vocals
 Richard Wright – Hammond organ, backing vocals
 Nick Mason – drums, bass drums, tape effects

with:

 Lesley Duncan – backing vocals
 Doris Troy – backing vocals
 Barry St. John – backing vocals
 Liza Strike – backing vocals

References 

Footnotes

Citations

External links 

1973 songs
Pink Floyd songs
Songs written by Roger Waters
Song recordings produced by David Gilmour
Song recordings produced by Roger Waters
Song recordings produced by Richard Wright (musician)
Song recordings produced by Nick Mason